Bainham is a settlement in the Tasman District of New Zealand.

Located in the Aorere valley, Bainham is situated on the northwestern side of the Aorere River. The settlement was originally called Riverdale, but when a post office was established there in 1896, a name change was required to avoid confusion with similarly named places, including Riversdale in Southland and Riverdale in Gisborne. The chosen name, Bainham, is a portmanteau of the surnames of two of the first European families to settle in the area, Bain and Graham. A telegraph office opened at Bainham in 1898.

In 1906, the population of Bainham was over 100, with the main activities in the area being dairy farming, gold mining in the Quartz Ranges, further up the Aorere River, and timber milling.

A new combined post office and general store was built in 1928 by the local postmaster, Edward Bates Langford. He leased part of the building to the Post Office and Telegraph Department to provide postal services, while using the remainder as a store. Langford's granddaughter, Lorna Langford, took over as postmistress in 1952 and the running of the general store in 1954. She ran the businesses until retiring in 2009. Lorna Langford died in 2020. The building was accorded historic place category 2 listing by Heritage New Zealand in 1990, and has become a tourist attraction in its own right.

Bainham is the nearest settlement to the northern end of the Heaphy Track,  to the southwest, and is a gateway to the Kahurangi National Park.

References

Further reading
 

Populated places in the Tasman District